Carl Johan Bengts (2 April 1876 – 10 October 1934) was a Finnish-Swedish painter in the Modernist style who specialized in rural themes.

Biography

He was born in Närpes, and came from a family of farmers; his father was an innkeeper. His first art lessons were taken in Helsinki from a decorative artist named Karl Hellsten. From 1895 to 1896 he continued his studies at the "Finnish Art Society Drawing School" (now the Academy of Fine Arts), then attended a similar school in Turku from 1897 to 1898 where he also took private lessons from Victor Westerholm.

He became a student assistant to Akseli Gallen-Kallela after 1899 and helped him to produce frescoes for the Finnish pavilion at the Exposition Universelle (1900).  In addition to his paintings and drawings, he designed furniture, rugs, book covers and small buildings. Among the buildings he designed are a cabin and wooden storehouse in Lempäälä (1900); the "Villa Helkavuori" in Kauniainen (1907, designed together with the sculptor) and a residence for the ski manufacturer Julius Uusitupa (1878-1950) on Salmi Beach, near Jyväskylä (1929).

Despite being of Swedish ancestry, he was a great admirer and promoter of Finnish folk-culture. He was also associated with "Septem", a group of artists who introduced French Impressionism to Finland.

After 1900, he became an activist against the administration of Governor-General Nikolay Bobrikov, a time known as the "Ensimmäinen sortokausi" (First Period of Oppression). During this time, he helped thwart Russian censorship by helping to smuggle in banned literature from Sweden.

Later, he acquired an estate in Ekenäs, which he planned to cultivate with his brother , who was also a painter, but they had to give up the property at the outbreak of World War I. In 1914, he and his wife went to Jyväskylä, where he painted cityscapes and interiors. After the war (from 1918 to 1927), they lived in Kristinestad, then returned to Jyväskylä, where he died in 1934.

Selected paintings

References

Further reading
 Marianne Koskimes-Envall, Antti Bengts, Jaako Linkamo and Dan Holm, Carl Bengts:Valo puhuu (light speaks), Pohjanmaa museo/Tampere taidemuseon, 2007 ,  Full text online

External links/sources 

 Photograph of Carl Bengts (1934) by Päijänne Studios (probably still copyrighted)

1876 births
1934 deaths
People from Närpes
People from Vaasa Province (Grand Duchy of Finland)
19th-century Finnish painters
19th-century Finnish male artists
20th-century Finnish painters
20th-century Finnish male artists
Landscape painters
Genre painters
Swedish-speaking Finns
Finnish people of Swedish descent
Finnish male painters